Hypostomus piratatu is a species of catfish in the family Loricariidae. It is native to South America, where it occurs in eastern tributaries of the Paraguay River in Argentina and Paraguay. The species reaches 27.5 cm (10.8 inches) in standard length and is believed to be a facultative air-breather.

References 

piratatu
Fish described in 1986